Randy Dean Keisler (born February 24, 1976) is an American former professional baseball pitcher. He attended Palmer High School in Palmer, Texas, and Louisiana State University.

Career

New York Yankees
Keisler was drafted by the New York Yankees in the 2nd round of the 1998 MLB Draft out of LSU. He had previously been drafted by the Cleveland Indians in the 40th round of the 1995 MLB Draft and the 57th round of the 1996 MLB Draft and the New York Mets in the 40th round of the 1997 MLB Draft but did not sign with either of those teams. He signed with the Yankees on June 2, 1998. He was selected as the Yankees Minor League player of the Year in 2000 when he was a combined 14-5 with a 2.85 ERA in 28 starts for Double-A Norwich and AAA Columbus.

Keisler made his Major League debut with the Yankees on September 10, 2000, against the Boston Red Sox, starting and pitching five innings to earn the win while allowing only one earned run. He appeared in 3 more games for the Yankees in 2000 out of the bullpen and then started 10 games for them in 2001. In his two seasons of part-time work he was 2-2 with a 7.19 ERA. He then missed the entire 2002 season while recovering from shoulder surgery he underwent in late 2001. In May 2002, Keisler, already on rehab with the shoulder injury, was bitten by a pygmy rattlesnake while gardening in his backyard. The Yankees released him in February, 2003.

San Diego Padres
Keisler signed as a free agent with the San Diego Padres on February 16, 2003, and made two starts with the Padres, while also appearing in 8 games (6 starts) for the AAA Portland Beavers. The Padres released him on June 5, 2003.

Texas Rangers/Houston Astros
He signed as a free agent with the Texas Rangers on June 16, 2003, and appeared in 5 games (2 starts) for the AAA Oklahoma RedHawks before he was released on July 14. Three days later he was signed by the Houston Astros and assigned to AAA New Orleans. He made nine starts and was 2-3 with a 4.28 ERA before becoming a free agent at the end of the season.

New York Mets
Keisler signed as a free agent with the New York Mets on February 17, 2004, and played the 2004 season with the AAA Norfolk Tides. He was 6-7 with a 3.81 ERA in 21 starts for the Tides.

Cincinnati Reds
He signed with the Cincinnati Reds as a free agent on November 12, 2004, and began the season with the AAA Louisville Bats where he was 5-2 in 12 appearances (7 starts) for a 2.88 ERA. He returned to the Majors on May 24 and made 24 appearances for the Reds in 2005, including 4 starts for a 2–1 record and 6.27 ERA.

Oakland Athletics
The Oakland Athletics signed him as a free agent on January 5, 2006, and he made 11 appearances (all out of the bullpen for the A's in 2006, with a 4.50 era and no record. He also made 25 appearances (16 starts) for the Sacramento River Cats in the Pacific Coast League, where he was 9-5 with a 3.83 ERA.

St. Louis Cardinals
He signed with the St. Louis Cardinals on November 16, 2006, but only made 4 appearances with the Cardinals, 3 of which were starts he finished 0-0 with a 5.19 ERA. He also made 24 starts for the AAA Memphis Redbirds and was 8-11 with a 4.79 ERA for the Redbirds.

Minnesota Twins/Chicago Cubs/Baltimore Orioles
Keisler signed a minor league contract with the Minnesota Twins on January 11, but was released during spring training and signed a minor league contract with the Chicago Cubs. On June 3, he opted out of his contract and on June 10, he signed with the Baltimore Orioles. In 2008, he was a combined 6-9 with a 4.03 ERA in 20 starts for the Iowa Cubs and Norfolk Tides.

2009/2010
Unable to sign with any Major League or affiliated minor league team after the 2008 season, he played in 2009 for the Southern Maryland Blue Crabs in the independent Atlantic League of Professional Baseball and in 2010 he played for the Vaqueros Laguna in the Mexican League.

Los Angeles Dodgers
On March 3, 2011, he attended an open tryout, sponsored by the Los Angeles Dodgers and was signed to a Minor League contract  He was assigned to the AAA Albuquerque Isotopes, where he appeared in 23 games (19 starts) and was 7-7 with a 4.67 ERA.

Independent career
He signed with the Long Island Ducks for the 2012 season and the Uni-President 7-Eleven Lions in 2013.

References

External links
, or Retrosheet
CPBL

1976 births
Living people
Albuquerque Isotopes players
American expatriate baseball players in Mexico
American expatriate baseball players in Taiwan
American people of German descent
Baseball players from Texas
Cincinnati Reds players
Columbus Clippers players
Greensboro Bats players
Iowa Cubs players
Leones del Escogido players
Long Island Ducks players
Louisville Bats players
LSU Tigers baseball players
Major League Baseball pitchers
Memphis Redbirds players
Mexican League baseball pitchers
Naranjeros de Hermosillo players
Navarro Bulldogs baseball players
Navegantes del Magallanes players
American expatriate baseball players in Venezuela
New Orleans Zephyrs players
New York Yankees players
Norfolk Tides players
Norwich Navigators players
Oakland Athletics players
Oklahoma RedHawks players
Oneonta Yankees players
Pensacola Pelicans players
People from Grimes County, Texas
Portland Beavers players
Sacramento River Cats players
San Diego Padres players
Southern Maryland Blue Crabs players
St. Louis Cardinals players
St. Lucie Mets players
Tampa Yankees players
Tigres del Licey players
American expatriate baseball players in the Dominican Republic
Uni-President 7-Eleven Lions players
Vaqueros Laguna players
Yaquis de Obregón players